André Frédéric Cournand (September 24, 1895 – February 19, 1988) was a French-American physician and physiologist.

Biography
Cournand was awarded the Nobel Prize in Physiology or Medicine in 1956 along with Werner Forssmann and Dickinson W. Richards for the development of cardiac catheterization.

Born in Paris, Cournand emigrated to the United States in 1930 and, in 1941, became a naturalized citizen.  For most of his career, Cournand was a professor at the Columbia University College of Physicians and Surgeons and worked at Bellevue Hospital in New York City.

Many seats of medical research have recognized his work, and he has received the Anders Retzius Silver Medal of the Swedish Society for Internal Medicine (1946), the Albert Lasker Award for Basic Medical Research (1949), the John Philipps Memorial Award of the American College of Physicians (1952), the Gold Medal of the Académie Royale de Médecine de Belgique and of the Académie Nationale de Médecine, Paris (1956). He was elected Doctor (honoris causa) of the Universities of Strasbourg (1957), Lyon (1958), Brussels (1959), Pisa (1961), and D.Sc. of the University of Birmingham (1961).

In 1981, Cournand became a founding member of the World Cultural Council.

His widow Beatrice died in 1993 aged 90.

References

Sources

External links

Nobel biography
National Academy of Sciences Biographical Memoir

1895 births
1988 deaths
French Nobel laureates
American physiologists
Columbia Medical School faculty
Founding members of the World Cultural Council
French emigrants to the United States
French physiologists
French military personnel of World War I
Nobel laureates in Physiology or Medicine
Recipients of the Albert Lasker Award for Basic Medical Research
Naturalized citizens of the United States
Physicians from Paris
People from Great Barrington, Massachusetts